Albert Engel may refer to:

Albert J. Engel (1888–1959), American politician
Albert J. Engel Jr. (1924–2013), American judge
Albert Engel (bishop) (died 1500), German Roman Catholic bishop